6th of October (October 6) is the 279th day of the year in the Gregorian calendar.

The date may also refer to:
The Yom Kippur War, a war between Israel and allied Egypt and Syria which broke on October 6, 1973

Things in Egypt named after the war
6th of October Governorate a defunct governorate in Egypt
6th October City, a planned city built in Giza governorate
6th October Bridge, an elevated highway in Cairo, Egypt

Date and time disambiguation pages